The 1978 Tour de Romandie was the 32nd edition of the Tour de Romandie cycle race and was held from 2 May to 7 May 1978. The race started in Geneva and finished in Thyon. The race was won by Johan van der Velde.

General classification

References

1978
Tour de Romandie
Tour de Romandie
1978 Super Prestige Pernod